Mainpuri Kachehri railway station is a small railway station in Mainpuri district, Uttar Pradesh. Its code is MPUE. It serves Jabalpur city. The station consists of a single platform. The platform is not well sheltered. It lacks many facilities including water and sanitation.

References

Railway stations in Mainpuri district
Allahabad railway division